Muhammed-Kabeer Olanrewaju Gbaja-Biamila, Sr. (born September 24, 1977), nicknamed "KGB", is a former American football defensive end who played nine seasons in the National Football League (NFL). He played college football at San Diego State. He was drafted by the Green Bay Packers in the fifth round of the 2000 NFL Draft, and played his entire career for the Packers. He was a Pro Bowl selection in 2003.

Early years
Gbaja-Biamila attended Crenshaw High School in Los Angeles, California and was a three-year letterman in football and in track and field. As a senior, he was named the Central City Defensive Lineman of the Year.

While attending Crenshaw High School, Gbaja-Biamila was a student-owner of 'Food From the Hood', an organic food company that sprang from the 1992 Los Angeles riots. Food From the Hood eventually went on to launch a line of salad dressings that appeared in major Southern California grocery chains as well as on Amazon.com. For their work, Food From the Hood received the "American Achievement Award" from Newsweek, which featured both Gbaja-Biamila and other founders on its cover. On November 1, 1994 Prince Charles paid a visit to Crenshaw High School, upon an invitation from Food From the Hood.

College career
Gbaja-Biamila attended San Diego State University where he was a three-year starter. He finished his career with the Aztecs with a school record 33 sacks, a mark previously held by former Packer Mike Douglass at 26 sacks. He was named a first-team all-conference selection in each of his last three seasons. He graduated with a degree in business administration.

Professional career
In 2000, attended the NFL Combine as an outside linebacker. He measured 6'3 and 3/4 while weighing in at 243 pounds.  He ran a 4.65 40 yard dash but fell in part because he was a tweener (teams weren't sure whether he had the bulk to be a DE or the ability to stick as an OLB) and some concerns over the competition he played against in college.

Gbaja-Biamila was chosen by the Packers in the fifth round of the 2000 NFL Draft with the 149th overall selection. In 2003, he became the first player in Packers history to record ten or more sacks in three consecutive seasons. He also played in the Pro Bowl that year. In 2004, he again recorded double-digit sacks, taking down opposing quarterbacks 13.5 times.

During the 2006 season, Gbaja-Biamila was demoted from starter to second string defensive end behind starters Aaron Kampman and Cullen Jenkins and accepted the role of a pass rushing specialist who is most active on passing downs.

In October 2007, Gbaja-Biamila broke the Green Bay Packers sack record with 69 sacks, which was previously held by Hall of Famer Reggie White with 68½ sacks. Originally, Gbaja-Biamila was not credited with a third sack against Vikings quarterback Kelly Holcomb during the Packers vs. Vikings game on September 30. Later on in the week, the Elias Sports Bureau reviewed game footage and credited Gbaja-Biamila with a third sack on Kelly Holcomb, who was originally ruled as rushing for zero yards.

Gbaja-Biamila played in seven games (one start) for the Packers in 2008, recording nine tackles, half a sack and a pass defensed. He was released on November 1 after the team activated defensive tackle Justin Harrell from the Physically Unable to Perform (PUP) list.

He was a 2013 inductee, along with Packer kicker Chris Jacke, into the Green Bay Packers Hall of Fame.

Family and personal life
Gbaja-Biamila is the fifth child of his mother Bolatito Gbaja-Biamila (née: Anjorin) and the second child of his father Mustapha Gbaja-Biamila. He is the older brother of former NFL linebacker Akbar Gbaja-Biamila. He also has a twin sister and another brother, Abdul.

His middle name "Ọláńrewájú" means "Wealth is moving forward" in the Yoruba language, while his surname “Gbàjàbíàmílà” translates to "One who, while fighting, pretends to be separating a fight." This comes from his paternal great-great-grandfather, who stood seven feet tall and was the village moderator in the Nigerian village in which he lived.

Both of his parents were Muslim, until his mother converted to Christianity. While he was raised in a Sunni Muslim household, during his rookie season with the Green Bay Packers he converted to Christianity.

He was the coordinator at the local Celebration Church Bayside for Crown Financial Ministries, which teaches people how to manage money using Biblical principles. He was involved in the first faith-based event at Lambeau Field called Lambeau Leap of Faith in July 2007, where thousands of Christians gathered.

An adherent of the dietary laws outlined in the Book of Leviticus, Gbaja-Biamila no longer self-identifies as a Christian, but as a Hebrew Israelite.

He formerly served on the board of directors at Freedom House Ministries, a shelter for homeless families in Green Bay. Each year, Freedom House helps over 100 families including over 250 children overcome homelessness and move into stable permanent housing and employment. In 2007, he started Kabeer's Freedom House Sack Fund. He pledged, along with his teammates and members of the Green Bay community, $10,000 per sack registered in 2007 to go to his fund.

On April 3, 2016, Gbaja-Biamila appeared alongside 2016 Republican presidential candidates Ted Cruz and Scott Walker at a rally in Green Bay, Wisconsin.

On December 17, 2019, Gbaja-Biamila was involved in an incident in which he was nearly arrested. His two friends were arrested during an incident at Assembly of God Church in Green Bay on Dec 17 during a Christmas pageant put on by the private Providence Academy. Jordan Salmi and Ryan Desmith attended the pageant and triggered a trespassing complaint since they do not have children at the school. When they were arrested, they reportedly had concealed weapons on them without permits.

The Green Bay Press-Gazette quoted Gbaha-Biamila saying “They got my sons — my property — doing pagan worship, and I told them I forbid it, and they dishonor me and say it’s OK for my sons to dishonor their father.” He added, “They used the sons, the children, to oppress the man, and the woman rules over them, so that the man walks in error.”

References

1977 births
Living people
American football defensive ends
African-American players of American football
American Christians
Players of American football from Los Angeles
San Diego State Aztecs football players
Green Bay Packers players
National Conference Pro Bowl players
American sportspeople of Nigerian descent
American people of Yoruba descent
Yoruba sportspeople
American former Muslims
Converts to Protestantism from Islam
American twins
Wisconsin Republicans
Crenshaw High School alumni
21st-century African-American sportspeople
20th-century African-American sportspeople
Ed Block Courage Award recipients